Am I Not Your Girl? is the third album by Irish singer Sinéad O'Connor and the follow-up to the hugely successful I Do Not Want What I Haven't Got. It is a collection of covers of mostly jazz standards, which O'Connor describes as "the songs I grew up listening to [and] that made me want to be a singer". The album title comes from the song "Success Has Made a Failure of Our Home". The album is dedicated to the people of New York City and especially the homeless whom O'Connor met at St. Mark's Place.

The album did not gain much critical acclaim, perhaps because O'Connor had become a major artist in the modern pop genre due to her previous album I Do Not Want What I Haven't Got and this album was composed of songs written from 1936 to 1978. This, coupled with the Garden State Arts Center controversy and an introduction in the album in which she mentions sexual abuse, addiction, emotional abuse, and asks "Où est le roi perdu? [translation: "Where is the lost king?"] If you're out there—I want to see you.", led to O'Connor losing much of the commercial momentum her career had built up until then.

The album's promotion was marked by a controversial appearance on Saturday Night Live, where O'Connor tore up a photo of Pope John Paul II, leading to public and media scrutiny.

Promotion

On 3 October 1992, O'Connor appeared on Saturday Night Live as a musical guest, and sang the album's lead single, "Success Has Made a Failure of Our Home". She was then scheduled to sing "Scarlet Ribbons" from the album, but the day before the appearance she changed to "War", a Bob Marley song which she intended as a protest against sexual abuse of children in the Catholic Church, referring to child abuse rather than racism. During the performance O'Connor wore a necklace with the Rastafari star and also had a scarf with the Rastafari and Ethiopian colors of red, green, and gold. She then presented a photo of Pope John Paul II to the camera while singing the word "evil", after which she tore the photo into pieces, while saying "Fight the real enemy".

O'Connor's action led into a public and media frenzy. NBC received more than 500 calls on Sunday, and 400 more on Monday, with all but seven criticising O'Connor; the network received 4,400 calls in total. Contrary to rumour, NBC was not fined by the Federal Communications Commission for O'Connor's act; the FCC has no regulatory power over such behaviour. NBC did not edit the performance out of the West Coast tape-delayed broadcast that night. , despite the now well documented  thousands of child sex abuse cases proving O'Connor's accusation, NBC still declines to rebroadcast the sequence, with reruns of the episode using footage from the dress rehearsal.

Track listing

Japanese Release
Three exclusive bonus tracks only appear on some copies of the original Japanese release of this album: "My Heart Belongs to Daddy", "Almost in Your Arms" and "Fly Me to the Moon."

Personnel

Sinéad O'Connor - vocals
Ira Siegel - guitar
David Finck - bass
David LeBolt - keyboards
Richard Tee - keyboards, vocals
Chris Parker - drums
John Reynolds - drums
Gloria Agostini - harp
Jerry O'Sullivan - Uilleann pipes 
Joanie Madden - tin whistle
Gerry Niewood - tenor saxophone, clarinet
Ted Nash - tenor saxophone, clarinet
Dave Tofani - alto saxophone, flute 
Dennis Anderson - alto saxophone, flute 
Ronnie Cuber - baritone saxophone, bass clarinet
Alan Rubin - trumpet, flugelhorn
Brian O'Flaherty - trumpet, flugelhorn
Joe Shepley - trumpet, flugelhorn
Lew Soloff - trumpet, flugelhorn
Robert Millikan - trumpet, flugelhorn
Birch Johnson - trombone
Jim Pugh - trombone
Keith O'Quinn - trombone
Kim Allan Cissel - trombone
George Flynn - trombone
Dave Braynard - tuba
Charles McCracken - cello
Fred Zlotkin - cello
Richard Locker - cello
Shelly Woodworth - English horn, oboe
Bob Carlisle - French horn
Fred Griffin - French horn 
John Clark - French horn
Alan Martin - violin
Arnold Eidus - violin
Barry Finclair - violin
Charles Libove - violin
Donna Tecco - violin
Elena Barere - violin
Gerald Tarack - violin
Jan Mullen - violin
John Pintavalle - violin
Laura Seaton - violin
Marti Sweet - violin
Matthew Raimondi - violin
Nancy McAlhany - violin
Richard Sortomme - violin
Jesse Levine - viola
Julien Barber - viola
Lamar Alsop - viola
David Nadien - concertmaster, violin
Torrie Zito - arranger, conductor
Patrick Williams - arrangement
Rob Mounsey - arranger, conductor 
Doug Katsaros - arranger, conductor 
Sid Ramin - arranger, conductor

Charts

Weekly charts

Year-end charts

Certifications and sales

References

1992 albums
Sinéad O'Connor albums
Chrysalis Records albums
Albums produced by Phil Ramone
Covers albums
Traditional pop albums